Italy participated in the Eurovision Song Contest 2019. Italian broadcaster RAI announced in November 2018 that the winning performer(s) of the Sanremo Music Festival 2019, later turning out to be Mahmood with "", would earn the right to represent the nation at the Eurovision Song Contest in Tel Aviv, Israel.

Background 

Prior to the 2019 contest, Italy had participated in the Eurovision Song Contest forty-four times since its first entry during the inaugural contest in 1956. Since then, Italy has won the contest on two occasions: in 1964 with the song "" performed by Gigliola Cinquetti and in 1990 with the song "" performed by Toto Cutugno. Italy has withdrawn from the Eurovision Song Contest a number of times with their most recent absence spanning from 1998 until 2010. Their return in 2011 with the song "Madness of Love", performed by Raphael Gualazzi, placed second—their highest result, to this point, since their victory in 1990. In 2018, Ermal Meta and Fabrizio Moro represented the nation with the song "", placing fifth with 308 points.

The Italian national broadcaster,  (RAI), broadcasts the event within Italy and organises the selection process for the nation's entry. RAI confirmed Italy's participation in the 2019 Eurovision Song Contest on 5 October 2018. Between 2011 and 2013, the broadcaster used the Sanremo Music Festival as an artist selection pool where a special committee would select one of the competing artist, independent of the results in the competition, as the Eurovision entrant. The selected entrant was then responsible for selecting the song they would compete with. For 2014, RAI forwent using the Sanremo Music Festival artist lineup and internally selected their entry. Since 2015, the winning artist of the Sanremo Music Festival is rewarded with the opportunity to represent Italy at the Eurovision Song Contest, although in 2016 the winner declined and the broadcaster appointed the runner-up as the Italian entrant.

Before Eurovision

Artist selection

On 20 November 2018, Italian broadcaster RAI confirmed that the performer that would represent Italy at the 2019 Eurovision Song Contest would be selected from the competing artists at the Sanremo Music Festival 2019. According to the rules of Sanremo 2019, the winner of the festival earns the right to represent Italy at the Eurovision Song Contest, but in case the artist is not available or refuses the offer, the organisers of the event reserve the right to choose another participant via their own criteria. The competition took place between 5–9 February 2019 with the winner being selected on the last day of the festival.

Twenty four artists competed in Sanremo 2019. Two of the twenty four competing artists (Einar and Mahmood respectively) were selected in the standalone Sanremo Newcomers competition that was held in December 2018. Among the competing artists were former Eurovision Song Contest entrants Il Volo who represented Italy in the 2015 contest. The performers were:

Final
The 24 Big Artists each performed their entry again for a final time on 9 February 2019. A combination of public televoting (50%), press jury voting (30%) and expert jury voting (20%) selected the top three to face a superfinal vote, then the winner of Sanremo 2019 was decided. Mahmood was declared the winner of the contest with the song "". During the press conference that followed the final, Mahmood accepted to compete in the Eurovision Song Contest. However, in an interview to  published on 11 February 2019, Mahmood stated that he was reconsidering his acceptance as he and his management had to consider "how much work it entails". Finally, on 12 February 2019, Mahmood confirmed his participation at the Eurovision Song Contest via his social media.

At Eurovision 
The Eurovision Song Contest 2019 took place at Expo Tel Aviv in Tel Aviv, Israel and consisted of two semi-finals on 14 and 16 May and the final on 18 May 2019. According to Eurovision rules, all nations with the exceptions of the host country and the "Big Five" (France, Germany, Italy, Spain and the United Kingdom) are required to qualify from one of two semi-finals in order to compete for the final; the top ten countries from each semi-final progress to the final. As a member of the "Big Five", Italy automatically qualified to compete in the final. In addition to their participation in the final, Italy is also required to broadcast and vote in one of the two semi-finals (the second one this year).

Voting
Voting during the three shows involved each country awarding two sets of points from 1-8, 10 and 12: one from their professional jury and the other from televoting. Each nation's jury consisted of five music industry professionals who are citizens of the country they represent, with their names published before the contest to ensure transparency. This jury judged each entry based on: vocal capacity; the stage performance; the song's composition and originality; and the overall impression by the act. In addition, no member of a national jury was permitted to be related in any way to any of the competing acts in such a way that they cannot vote impartially and independently. The individual rankings of each jury member, as well as the nation's televoting results, were released shortly after the grand final.

Points awarded to Italy

Points awarded by Italy

Detailed voting results
The following members comprised the Italian jury:
 Elisabetta Esposito (jury chairperson)journalist
 digital entertainer
 Mauro Severoniaudio engineer manager
 Adriano Penninimaestro (jury member in semi-final 2)
 Stefania Zizzari (jury member in the final)
 Paolo Biamontejournalist

References

2019
Countries in the Eurovision Song Contest 2019
Eurovision
Eurovision